Hugh Osgood is a British church leader, conference speaker, author and modern church historian. He was appointed Moderator of the Free Churches Group on 17 September 2014, following the resignation of Revd Michael Heaney. He is also the Free Churches President of Churches Together in England, the Co-Chair of the UK Charismatic and Pentecostal Leaders’ Conference and the founding President of Churches in Communities International. He serves on the Councils of Reference of numerous organisations either as Free Churches Moderator or in his own right.

Early life and education
Osgood was born in 1947 into a Salvation Army family in Southall, England. Osgood attended The Knoll School for Boys. He studied at the Trinity School of Music in London for a teaching diploma and then at St Bartholomew's Hospital Medical School and the London School of Dentistry (The Royal Dental Hospital), receiving a Bachelor of Dental Surgery degree in 1970. Subsequently, he received a Master of Divinity degree through the Full Gospel Assembly Bible College' Lahore, Pakistan, in 2001 and then received his PhD through The School of African and Oriental Studies at London University in 2006.

Career
In 1970–1971, Osgood occupied the role of House Surgeon at St. George's Hospital in Tooting, The Royal Dental Hospital, London, and then at The Middlesex Hospital, London. He spent 19 years in general dental practice (mostly part-time) in Bexleyheath. In summer 1965 when reading C.S. Lewis’ Mere Christianity, having discovered his calling as an evangelical Christian leader, he pursued his local church ministry vocation in parallel throughout this time.

Osgood was accepted to serve as a missionary with the African Evangelical Fellowship in 1971 but his intentions were frustrated by Zambia's then President Kaunda's decision at that time to cut aid to medical projects. Osgood then joined forces with a small house church in Forest Hill in London, that was linked to the ministry of George North, before planting a congregation in Bromley, which he led as Bromley North Free Church until 1991. Osgood gave up dentistry incrementally while pastoring the Bromley church.

Local-church ministry
The elders of Bromley Christian Centre, part of the Assemblies of God in Great Britain, approached Osgood in 1989 and it was decided to combine their church's ministry with that of Bromley North Free Church. After a year of joint activity, Osgood then planted Cornerstone Christian Centre in 1991 as an independent resource centre church where he pioneered a TV department (which was to become Charis Communications), the staff of which, including Howard Conder and Rory and Wendy Alec, went on to establish Revelation TV and GOD TV. Broadcasting began in 1994 on London Cable Network.

Inter-church ministry
In 1984-89, Osgood assisted George Verwer's Operation Mobilization International Co-ordinating team in Bromley as honorary team pastor whilst serving on the board of Send The Light, OM's publishing and distribution arm. From 1988, he worked for Billy Graham's Mission '89, and then established the Council of Reference for Morris Cerullo's Mission to London in 1992.

Osgood assumed the role of London Co-ordinator for the Evangelical Alliance for the period 1997-99. His work continued with the Evangelical Alliance as he served on the board of the African and Caribbean Evangelical Alliance and later on the Hope for London Steering Group between 2003 and 2008. From 2011-2014, Osgood served as Vice-Chair and then Mission Consultant for Crossing London.

In 1997, Osgood founded the global church network, Churches in Communities International, and went on to initiate the UK Advisory Board for Christian Studies in 2001 with its School of Biblical Studies, School of Biblical Studies for Leaders and master's degree programme. Through his work Church in Communities International, and in acknowledgment of the breadth of his inter-church engagement, he was elected as the 60th Free Churches Moderator by the then twenty-four Free Church denominations of England and Wales in September 2014.

Presidencies and patronages

Personal life
Osgood is married to Marion and they have three children and eleven grandchildren.

Bibliography

Journal articles
 'Pentecostalism: global trends and local adjustments' Journal of European Pentecostal Theological Association, 28:1 (2008)

Book chapters
 'The Rise of Black Churches' in D. Goodhew (Ed), Church growth in Britain – 1980 to the present, (Farnham: Ashgate, 2012)
 'A biblical theology for engaging with society' in D.Singleton (Ed), Faith with its sleeves rolled up - a collection of essays on the role of faith in society,(London: Faith Action, 2013)

Books
 Blessing the nations - discovering your part in God's plan, (Croydon: Sophos Books, 2007)
 Fulfilling your ministry - communication, identification and partnership, (Croydon: Sophos Books, 2009)
 The Power of Purity - Maintaining a Christian testimony in a compromising world, (Charis House Books, 2016)
 Understanding God - Disclosing the plan of salvation, (Charis House Books, 2016) 
 with Glenn Myers, The Failure File, (London: Scripture Union, 1991)

References 

1947 births
Living people
British Pentecostals
People from Southall
Clergy from London